Astroblepus mindoensis is a species of catfish of the family Astroblepidae. It is a benthic species inhabiting clear, fast flowing waters. It grows to  standard length.

References

Astroblepus
Freshwater fish of Ecuador
Endemic fauna of Ecuador
Fish described in 1916
Taxa named by Charles Tate Regan